Eddy Rodríguez (born December 1, 1985) is a Cuban-American professional baseball former catcher and coach. He was the catching coach for the Miami Marlins of Major League Baseball (MLB) from 2020 to 2022. He played in MLB for the San Diego Padres.

Rodríguez's family defected from Cuba on his father's fishing boat when he was eight years old, nearly dying on the journey. Rodríguez played college baseball for the University of Miami before beginning his professional career.

Early life
Rodríguez was born in Villa Clara Province, Cuba. His parents, Edilio and Ylya Rodriguez, operated a farm and his father fished.

The Rodríguez family, consisting of Eddy, his parents, his sister Yanisbet, and his cousin Carlos, defected from Cuba when he was eight years old on his father's fishing boat. Eddy was unaware of the defection until they were at sea. Their boat nearly capsized in a storm and they ran out of food, resorting to eating ground coffee beans, before they were discovered by the United States Coast Guard. The family settled in Miami and Rodríguez graduated from Coral Gables Senior High School in Coral Gables, Florida.

Baseball career

Cincinnati Reds
Rodríguez received a scholarship from the University of Miami, where he played college baseball as the starting catcher for the Miami Hurricanes baseball team. The Cincinnati Reds drafted Rodríguez in the 20th round of the 2006 Major League Baseball draft. He played in the Reds minor league baseball organization until 2009, reaching Class AA with the Chattanooga Lookouts of the Southern League, when he began playing independent league baseball.

El Paso Diablos/Sioux Falls Pheasants
Rodríguez played in the American Association of Independent Professional Baseball for the El Paso Diablos in 2009 and the Sioux Falls Pheasants in 2010.

San Diego Padres
In 2011, Rodríguez returned to organized baseball when he signed a minor league contract with the San Diego Padres. He was promoted to the Padres on August 1, 2012, from the Lake Elsinore Storm of the Class A-Advanced California League, after starting catcher Yasmani Grandal was placed on the disabled list.

Rodríguez made his Major League debut on August 2, 2012, against the Cincinnati Reds. He hit a home run off of Johnny Cueto in his first major league at-bat. Rodríguez made two starts for the Padres in 2012, going 1 for 5 at the plate. He was optioned to the Triple-A Tucson Padres on August 9 when opening-day catcher Nick Hundley was recalled.

On September 4, 2012, Rodríguez was designated for assignment and moved off the 40-man roster.  The Padres re-signed Rodríguez as a minor-league free agent and invited him to 2013 spring training.

Tampa Bay Rays
Rodríguez signed a minor league deal with the Tampa Bay Rays in January 2014.

New York Yankees
He signed a minor league contract with the New York Yankees for the 2015 and 2016 seasons. He received a non-roster invitation to spring training on February 5, 2016.

Minnesota Twins
In December 2016, Rodriguez signed a minor league contract with the Minnesota Twins.

Second Stint with Yankees
The Twins released him after spring training, and he signed a minor league contract with the Yankees. He elected free agency on November 6, 2017, and ended his playing career.

Coaching career
Rodríguez served as the Los Angeles Angels minor league catching coordinator in 2019. Rodríguez was named the catching coach for the Miami Marlins prior to the 2020 season.

See also

List of baseball players who defected from Cuba
List of Major League Baseball players with a home run in their first major league at bat

References

External links

1985 births
Living people
Sports coaches from Miami
People from Villa Clara Province
Baseball coaches from Florida
Baseball players from Miami
Defecting Cuban baseball players
Major League Baseball catchers
Major League Baseball coaches
San Diego Padres players
Miami Marlins coaches
Miami Hurricanes baseball players
Gulf Coast Reds players
Dayton Dragons players
Sarasota Reds players
Chattanooga Lookouts players
El Paso Diablos players
Sioux Falls Pheasants players
Tucson Padres players
Lake Elsinore Storm players
San Antonio Missions players
Durham Bulls players
Scranton/Wilkes-Barre RailRiders players
Trenton Thunder players
Minor league baseball coaches
Mat-Su Miners players
Coral Gables Senior High School alumni